Ilya Ushakov (born 10 May 1991) is a Belarusian former footballer. His latest club was Smorgon in 2015.

External links

Profile at pressball.by

1991 births
Living people
Belarusian footballers
FC Minsk players
FC Kommunalnik Slonim players
FC Slonim-2017 players
FC Smorgon players
Association football midfielders